According to the Talmud, the House of Avtinas was responsible for compounding the ketoret, the incense offered on the Inner Altar in the Temple of Jerusalem.

The Talmud praised the Avtinas family for never permitting the family's female members to be seen wearing perfume, to avoid any possible suspicion that they might be appropriating Temple resources for their own personal use. The Talmud relates that they knew a secret ingredient -- Maaleh Ashan—that had the ability to make the smoke from the incense rise straight up in a column. They refused to disclose the secret and it became lost following the Second Temple's destruction in 70 CE. According to the Mishna (Yoma 3:11), the Rabbis censured the House of Avtinas (among others) for their refusal to share the knowledge of the Maaleh Ashan. The Gemorah (Yoma 38a) states that the House Avtinas defended themselves to the sages that they feared that if they revealed the secret it would be used for idolatry (Yoma 38a); there are differing traditions as to whether the Rabbis accepted this defense and removed the censure from Avitnas.

The Talmud relates that the officers of the Temple once attempted to replace the House of Avtinas, but the replacement workers were unable to compound the incense in a way that made the smoke from the offering rise in the expected manner. The Talmud relates said that:

When the Sages learned of the matter, they said "All that the Holy One, Blessed Be He, created, He created for His glory, as it is said (Proverbs 16:4) 'Everything God made for His sake.' " The Sages sent after them, but they did not want to come back until [the Sages] doubled their wages. Jerusalem Talmud Shekalim 5:1 (Schottenstein Edition 14a)

The phrase "Who created everything for His Glory" is used in the first blessing of the Sheva Brachot (Seven Blessings) at a Jewish wedding ceremony, and in the Birkat HaMazon (Grace after meals) during the 3-7 day honeymoon period afterwards. Commentators connect the use of this phrase in this Talmudic passage to its use in the marriage ceremony to illustrate interpretive ideas—that everyone has unique talents which must be recognized, that it is sage to accept with grace what one cannot change—connecting the stories of the House of Avtinas and House of Garmu with wisdom and insight necessary to maintain a harmonious marriage.

Talmud Tractate Sheqalim relates another story about the House of Avtinas:

Rabbi Akiva said: Shimon Ben Loga related the following to me: I was once collecting grasses, and I saw a child from the House of Avtinas. And I saw that he cried, and I saw that he laughed. I said to him, "My son, why did you cry?" He said, Because of the glory of my Father's house that has decreased." I asked "And why did you laugh?" He said to me "Because of the glory prepared for the righteous in the future." I asked "And what did you see?" [that brought on these emotions]. "The herb Maaleh Ashan is growing next to me."

References 

The Schottenstein Edition of the Talmud, Tractate Shekalim, Mesorah Publications Ltd, 2005.

Second Temple
Priesthood (Judaism)
Jewish families